= Radio piracy =

Radio piracy may refer to:

- Pirate radio, unlicensed radio broadcasting
- Copyright infringement of music ripped from AM or FM radio broadcasts
